"Cry" is a song by New Zealand-Australian rock band Dragon released in May 1984 as the third single from the group's seventh studio album Body and the Beat (1984). The song peaked at number 17 on the Australian Kent Music Report.

Track listing 
 Cry (Johanna Pigott, Todd Hunter) - 3:43
 What Am I Gonna Do? (Alan Mansfield, Kenny Jacobson, Robert Taylor, Paul Hewson, Todd Hunter) - 3:41

Charts

Personnel 
 Guitar, vocals – Robert Taylor
 Keyboards, guitar, vocals – Alan Mansfield
 Keyboards, vocals – Paul Hewson
 Lead vocals – Marc Hunter
 Percussion – Terry Chambers
 Vocals, bass – Todd Hunter

References 

Dragon (band) songs
1984 singles
1984 songs
Polydor Records singles
Mercury Records singles
Songs written by Johanna Pigott
Songs written by Todd Hunter